The 2022–23 Biathlon World Cup – Nations Cup Women started on 30 November 2022 in Kontiolahti and will conclude on 17 March 2023 in Oslo Holmenkollen.

2022–23 Top 3 standings

Standings 

Each nation's score comprises the points earned by its three best placed athletes in every Sprint and Individual competition, the points earned in the Men's Relay competitions, and half of the points earned in the (Single) Mixed Relay competitions. 

Intermediate standings after 13 competitions.

References 

Nations Cup Women